The 2022 WBSC Men's Softball World Championship was the 17th Men's Softball World Championship, an international softball tournament taking place in Auckland, New Zealand from 26 November to 4 December 2022. Originally scheduled for February 2021, the tournament was postponed due to the COVID-19 pandemic. New Zealand last hosted the tournament in 2013. It will be the 17th edition of the tournament.

Argentina were the defending champions, and lost the third place playoff to the United States. Australia defeated Canada 5–2 in the final to claim their second World Cup.

Qualified teams

Squads

Officials
15 umpires were selected by the WBSC for the tournament.

Venue
Rosedale Park in Rosedale, Auckland hosted all the games across two fields.

Opening Round

Group A

Group B

Placement Round
The bottom three teams from each group progress to the placement round. Head to head results against the other bottom three team from the Opening Round will carry over to help determine final placings. In games between equal seeds, a coin toss determines the home team.

Super Round
The top three teams from each group progress to the placement round. Head to head results against the other top three team from the Opening Round will carry over to help determine final placings and the four nations that qualify for the Final Round. In games between equal seeds, a coin toss determines the home team.

Final Round

Third place play-off

Final

Statistics

The statistics below include all opening, super and placement round games.

Homeruns
3 homeruns

 Alan Peker
 Nick Shailes
 Bryan Abrey
 Derek Mayson
 Kazuya Toriyama
 Blaine Milheim

2 homeruns

 James Todhunter
 Colin Walsh
 Vojtěch Buchner
 Vojtěch Forman
 George Harris
 Tei Hamamoto
 Hikaru Matsuda
 Reilly Makea
 Jonathan Lynch

1 homerun

 Santiago Carril
 Manuel Godoy
 Julian Jemmott
 Marshall Kronk
 Hayden Mathews
 Joshua McGovern
 Scott Patterson
 Shane Boland
 Quinten Bruce
 Bradley Ezekiel
 Mathieu Roy
 Ty Sebastian
 Reynaldo Lamote
 Osvaldo Pérez
 Yesander Rodriguez
 Miguel Savigne
 Tomáš Klein
 Marek Malý
 Tobias Holmelund
 Benjamin Enoka
 Thomas Enoka
 Cole Evans
 Joel Evans
 Jerome Raemaki
 Pita Rona
 Denmark Bathan
 Melvin de Castro
 Justine Rosales
 Melvin de Castro
 Tyler Croft
 Yusef Davis Jr.
 Erick Ochoa
 Matt Palazzo
 Cameron Schiller
 Rafael Flores
 Edinson Marrero

Leading players

Player of the day

Final standings

Awards

Broadcasting
Whakaata Māori broadcast all 50 games on the MĀORI+ app with all New Zealand games also on television. International viewers were able to stream the tournament on WBSC's OTT Channel GameTime.

Symbols

Match balls
The match balls used for the 2022 tournament were the Mizuno M150 balls, which were also used in the Tokyo 2022 Olympics. Mizuno supplied 1,152 balls for the tournament.

External links
Official Website

References

World Championship
Softball World Championship, 2022
Men's Softball World Championship
Softball World Championship, 2022
Softball World Championship
Softball World Championship